Ability Office is an office suite developed by Ability Plus Software and distributed and marketed by Ability Software International and which consists of a word processor, spreadsheet, database, modules for presentation and photo or image editing, plus a photo/image organiser and vector line drawing application. The current version (V6) offers a level of compatibility with Microsoft Office, allowing users to create, load from and save both to Microsoft Office 2010 (*.docx etc.) and earlier (*.doc etc.) file formats. In the same way, the photo and image editing application will create, load from and save to Adobe Photoshop (*.psd) file formats, together with other mainstream graphical file types. 

Not only can version 6 be downloaded from the Ability website, older versions are also available for download. The most recent version is version 11.

Development history
Development began in 1992 following a decision to replace Ability Plus, an existing DOS-based integrated package, and a first release was made in 1995 called Ability for Windows and consisted of modules for word processing, spreadsheet, database and communications (a terminal program).

A second version was released in 1998 called Ability Office 98. The framework for the entire suite was changed from Borland OWL to Microsoft MFC resulting in better performance and the database was re-written to use the Jet Database Engine.

Since then, modules have been added (an image editing module in 2000 and a presentation module in 2004) but the architecture has broadly remained the same with the step to a fully Unicode version being made in 2008. Ability Office is 100% C++, entirely 32-bit and uses the Microsoft Visual C++ 2005 compiler.

New version 8, released September 2018, includes Word Processor, Spreadsheet, Presentation, Database, Photo-editor, has a Microsoft Office 2016 style interface, is compatible with Windows 10 and all Windows versions back to XP, supports ODF import/export, allows switching interfaces between traditional toolbar mode and ribbon style, supports for 4k/hi-res displays, supports OOXML import/export — native support for docx, xlsx, pptx, and is free for personal (non-commercial) use.

OEM versions
In October 2006, Tesco launched a range of own-brand software that included Tesco Complete Office, a Tesco-branded version of Ability Office.

Corel (Home) Office, Corel Home Suite are based on Ability Office 5.

Version summary
Source:

See also
List of office suites
Comparison of office suites

References

External links
Official website

British brands
Office suites